Ranoidea is a genus of frogs in the subfamily Pelodryadinae. They are found in Australia, New Guinea, and two nearby groups of islands: the Maluku Islands, and the Louisiade Archipelago. The circumscription of this taxon is still controversial.

Taxonomy
Species in this genus were until recently placed in the then-paraphyletic genus Litoria; many of them had been placed in even larger Hyla before. However, in 2016 Duellman and colleagues split Litoria into several genera. The systematic and taxonomic conclusions based on Duellman et al. should be treated with caution, because 78.9% of individuals (397/503) used in the concatenated analyses had less than half of the gene sequences available for the 19 genes used. Missing data can be problematic in phylogenetic analyses (e.g.) and lead to erroneous conclusions about systematic relationships. Additionally, there is no mention of checking for base-composition bias amongst taxa (non-stationarity), which can also lead to incorrect tree phylogenies (e.g.). The species now in Ranoidea were placed in the genus Dryopsophus. However, the oldest available name for these species is Ranoidea. These changes are not yet widely recognized or accepted, and the AmphibiaWeb continues to recognize Litoria in the older, broad sense. The AmphibiaWeb also recognizes Cyclorana, a position that, without additional amendments, renders Ranoidea paraphyletic; it may be treated as a subgenus.

Description and ecology
The pupil is horizontally elliptical, and the palpebral membrane is unpigmented. Many species have tadpoles that develop in mountain streams and have enlarged ventral mouths. However, tadpoles of subgenus Cyclorana are adapted to standing water and are often found in temporary water bodies.

Species
The following species are recognised in the genus Ranoidea:

Although currently listed as incertae sedis, it is expected that "Ranoidea papua" (Van Kampen, 1909) will also be included in the genus once its range has been properly delimited.

References

 

Amphibian genera
Taxa named by Johann Jakob von Tschudi